The Divine Ryans is a 1999 Canadian film directed by Stephen Reynolds, written by Wayne Johnston as an adaptation of his novel, and starring Robert Joy and Pete Postlethwaite. The film tells the story of the Ryan family, who run a funeral parlour in St. John's, Newfoundland and Labrador.

Plot
The Ryans of St John's, Newfoundland, are an old family steeped in tradition. Donald Ryan edits the local newspaper while his brothers and sisters run the funeral parlour. Early one morning, Donald's son Draper Doyle goes to the newspaper office to surprise his father with a birthday cake, only to witness something traumatic. Two days later, Donald Ryan is dead. In the ensuing weeks, Draper Doyle's sleep is plagued by nightmares, and he realises he has no memories of the time surrounding his father's death. With the help of his uncle Reg, Draper Doyle tries to come to terms with the truth about Donald Ryan, and the key to this may be Donald's lucky hockey puck.

Cast

Accolades
The film received three Genie Award nominations at the 20th Genie Awards in 2000, for Best Adapted Screenplay (Johnston), Best Cinematography (Alywn Kumst) and Best Sound Editing (Alastair Gray, Donna Powell and Clive Turner).

References

External links
 

1999 drama films
1999 films
Canadian independent films
English-language Canadian films
Canadian drama films
Films set in Newfoundland and Labrador
Funeral homes in fiction
1990s English-language films
1990s Canadian films